Francis Sykes may refer to:

Sir Francis Sykes, 1st Baronet (1732–1804), British diplomat, MP
Sir Francis Sykes, 2nd Baronet (c.1767–1804), MP for Wallingford
Sir Francis Sykes, 3rd Baronet (c.1799–1842), husband of Lady Henrietta Sykes, lover of Benjamin Disraeli